Herbert Kutscha (24 April 1917  – 19 September 2003 ) was a German Luftwaffe fighter ace and recipient of the Knight's Cross of the Iron Cross during World War II. The Knight's Cross of the Iron Cross was awarded to recognise extreme battlefield bravery or successful military leadership. He was one of few Luftwaffe pilots to survive the whole war, serving from 1939 until 1945. During his career he was credited with 47 aerial victories in more than 900 missions.

Career
Kutscha was born on 24 April 1917 in Ratibor, present-day Racibórz in southern Poland, at the time in the Province of Silesia of the Kingdom of Prussia. He began his military career as an Unteroffizier within 5. Staffel of Jagdgeschwader 77 (JG 77—77th Fighter Wing). He claimed his first victory during the "Phoney War" by shooting down a Royal Air Force (RAF) Vickers Wellington bomber on 14 December 1939. The bombers from No. 99 Squadron were on a mission to attack the Kriegsmarine cruisers Nürnberg and Leipzig which were returning to port after they were hit by torpedoes fired from the Royal Navy submarine  the day before. This was followed by a Lockheed Hudson on 24 February 1940. In March 1940, Kutscha was transferred to 5./Zerstörergeschwader 1. With this unit he took part in the  campaign in the West. This unit was changed to 8./ZG 1 on 26 June 1940. With this unit he participated in Battle of Britain. The unit was finally transformed on 24 April 1941 to Schnellkampfgeschwader 210. With this unit Kutscha entered the war on the Eastern Front and received the German Cross in Gold on 14 February 1942 and Knight's Cross of the Iron Cross on 24 September 1942.

With Jagdgeschwader 3 "Udet"
In 1943, the Luftwaffe planned to expand the authorized strength of every Jagdgeschwader from three to four Gruppen. On 1 June 1943, Jagdgeschwader 3 "Udet" (JG 3—3rd Fighter Wing) was among the first units expanded. At Neubiberg Airfield near Munich, VI. Gruppe of JG 3, under the command of Hauptmann Franz Beyer, was created by spawning elements of I., II. and III. Gruppe of JG 3. The three Staffeln of VI. Gruppe were headed by Oberleutnant Franz Daspelgruber, as commander of 10. Staffel, Oberleutnant Gustav Frielinghaus, commanding 11. Staffel, and Kutscha, who was given command of 12. Staffel. The Gruppe was equipped with the Messerschmitt Bf 109 G-6 and was sent to southern Italy to fight in the Mediterranean front. In early July 1943, all elements of VI. Gruppe were based at Lecce Airfield until they were transferred to Sicily on 11 July.

Defense of the Reich
On 24 September, VI. Gruppe was ordered back to Germany, where the unit was initially based at Neubiberg Airfield again. The increasing success of the Allied Combined Bomber Offensive had forced the Oberkommando der Luftwaffe (OKL—High Command of the Air Force) to relocate its forces. In total, five Gruppen were withdrawn from other theaters of operations and redeployed to Defense of the Reich in August and September 1943. At Neubiberg, the Gruppe received a new complement of Bf 109 G-6 aircraft while the pilots were trained in formation flying and tactics in fighting the combat box, a tactical formation used by heavy bombers of the United States Army Air Forces (USAAF). On 18 December, the Gruppe was ordered to Grimbergen. Before this order was executed, on 19 December, the Fifteenth Air Force attacked railroading targets at Innsbruck and the Messerschmitt factories at Augsburg. Defending against this attack, Kutscha claimed the destruction of a B-24 bomber.

On 24 February 1944, during Big Week, Kutscha was shot down in his Bf 109 G-6 (Werknummer 411048—factory number) by a Republic P-47 Thunderbolt in aerial combat near Quakenbrück. The following day, Hauptmann Eberhard von Boremski succeeded Kutscha as command of 12. Staffel. In July 1944, he returned to the front in Normandy and succeeded Leutnant Franz Ruhl as Staffelkapitän of 4. Staffel of JG 3, a squadron of II. Gruppe. Ruhl was hospitalized due to physical and mental exhaustion. On 20 July, Kutscha became Gruppenkommandeur (group commander) of II. Gruppe of JG 3, succeeding Hauptmann Hans-Ekkehard Bob in this command position. Command of 4. Staffel returned to Ruhl after his return from the hospital. On 25 November 1944, II. Gruppe was detached from JG 3. The Gruppe was converted to fly the Messerschmitt Me 262 "Stormbird" jet fighter and became the I. Gruppe of Jagdgeschwader 7 (JG 7—7th Fighter Wing), the first operational jet fighter wing.

With Jagdgeschwader 27 and 11
Kutscha did not convert to the Me 262, he was transferred to Jagdgeschwader 27 (JG 27—27th Fighter Wing) and appointed Staffelkapitän of the 15. Staffel of JG 27 on 14 December 1944. He replaced Hauptmann Ernst Laube who was transferred. On 17 December 1944, Hauptmann Fritz Keller, the Gruppenkommandeur of II. Gruppe of JG 27, was shot down and wounded in combat. In consequence, Kutscha was transferred and tasked with the leadership of II. Gruppe. On 25 December 1944, during the Ardennes offensive, Kutscha claimed two North American P-51 Mustang fighters shot down west of the Nürburgring. The mission was to provide ground support for German troops fighting around St. Vith. Kutscha led his fighters from Hopsten to the Schnee Eifel area where they were intercepted by USAAF fighters returning from a fighter escort mission near Adenau and the Nürburgring. In this encounter, German fighters claimed four aerial victories for the loss of eight Bf 109s. His victor may have been Captain Bertrum Edwin Ellingson from the 356th Fighter Group.

On 23 February 1945, he was appointed Gruppenkommandeur of the III. Gruppe of Jagdgeschwader 11 (JG 11—11th Fighter Wing), succeeding Oberleutnant Paul-Heinrich Dähne, who was transferred.

Kutscha flew more than 900 missions. He was credited with 47 victories in air combat—44 of which were on the Western Front (at least six were four-engine bombers)—plus at least 44 aircraft destroyed on the ground. He successfully targeted dozens of different objectives, including 41 tanks, 15 locomotives, 11 artillery positions, and 157 vehicles. Kutscha died 19 September 2003 in Kempten at the age of 86.

Summary of career

Aerial victory claims
According to Obermaier, Kutscha was credited with 47 aerial victories claimed in over 900 combat missions. This figure includes 18 claims on the Eastern Front, and 29 on the Western Front, including six four-engine bombers. Mathews and Foreman, authors of Luftwaffe Aces — Biographies and Victory Claims, researched the German Federal Archives and state that he claimed at least 39 aerial victories, potentially 45 claims. He claimed approximately 18 aerial victories on the Eastern Front, and 21 on the Western Front which includes six four-engine bombers.

Victory claims were logged to a map-reference (PQ = Planquadrat), for example "PQ 14 Ost 51331". These sectors were then subdivided into 36 smaller units to give a location area 3 × 4 km in size.

Awards
 Iron Cross (1939)
 2nd Class
 1st Class
 Front Flying Clasp of the Luftwaffe in Gold with Pennant "500"
 Wound Badge in Black (25 December 1944)
 Honour Goblet of the Luftwaffe on 3 November 1941 as Oberfeldwebel and pilot
 German Cross in Gold on 14 February 1942 as Oberfeldwebel in the 5./Kampfgeschwader 210 (S)
 Knight's Cross of the Iron Cross on 24 September 1942 as Leutnant of the Reserves and pilot in the II./Schnellkampfgeschwader 210

Notes

References

Citations

Bibliography

 
 
 
 
 
 
 
 
 
 
 
 
 
 
 
 
 
 
 
 
 

1917 births
2003 deaths
Luftwaffe pilots
People from the Province of Silesia
People from Racibórz
German World War II flying aces
Recipients of the Gold German Cross
Recipients of the Knight's Cross of the Iron Cross